Eucalyptus melanoleuca, commonly known as yarraman ironbark or nanango ironbark, is a species of tree that is endemic to south-east Queensland. It has rough ironbark on the trunk and larger branches, smooth bark above, lance-shaped adult leaves, flower buds in groups of seven, white flowers and barrel-shaped, to cup-shaped or conical fruit.

Description
It has rough black bark on the trunk and larger branches, smooth white bark above. The flower buds are arranged in leaf axils and on the ends of branchlets on a branching peduncle, each branch with groups of seven buds. Flowering mainly occurs between June and September and the flowers are white.

Taxonomy and naming
Eucalyptus melanoleuca was first formally described by Stanley Thatcher Blake in the journal Austrobaileya from a specimen he collected near Yarraman. The specific epithet (melanoleuca) refers to the strongly contrasted black and white trunk.

Distribution and habitat
Yarraman ironbark grows in open forest and on the edges of rainforest between the Blackdown Tableland and Yarraman.

Conservation status
This eucalypt is classed as "least concern" under the Queensland Government Nature Conservation Act 1992.

See also
List of Eucalyptus species

References

Trees of Australia
melanoleuca
Myrtales of Australia
Flora of Queensland
Plants described in 1977
Taxa named by Stanley Thatcher Blake